Deh-e Zu ol Faqar Sarperi (also Romanized as Deh-e Z̄ū ol Faqār Sarperī) is a village in Dehdasht-e Gharbi Rural District, in the Central District of Kohgiluyeh County, Kohgiluyeh and Boyer-Ahmad Province, Iran. At the 2006 census, its population was 39, in 7 families.

References 

Populated places in Kohgiluyeh County